Chike and the River is a children's story by Chinua Achebe. It was first published in 1966 by Cambridge University Press, with illustrations by Prue Theobalds, and was the first of several children's stories Achebe would write. The latest reprint has a cover design by Victor Ekpuk.

Plot
It is the story of a Nigerian boy called Chike who leaves his village, Umuofia, to go and stay with his uncle in the big city of Onitsha.He has a lot of friends that made him thrilled when he meet and he was the only child to survive crossing the river.

Reviews
Reviewing a 2011 reprint of the book, New York Journal of Books said: "In Chike and the River, young readers get an intimate look at African life, learn about the Niger River, and connect with Chike as if he was their own sibling. The brilliance of Mr. Achebe’s prose is his ability to make a readers feel like an omniscient sprite on Chike’s shoulder: along for the ride and privy to all that he senses and sees."

References

Novels by Chinua Achebe
1966 Nigerian novels
Novels set in Nigeria
Children's novels
Nigerian English-language novels
1966 children's books